Mount Mee is a rural town and locality in the Moreton Bay Region, Queensland, Australia.

Geography

Brisbane–Woodford Road (Mount Mee Road) runs through from south to north.

History
The area around Mount Mee was known to the indigenous inhabitants of the area as Dahmongah, a word meaning "flying squirrel" or glider.  The English name Mount Mee is possibly derived from another local word mia-mia, meaning a view or lookout, but this name was not formalised until the establishment of the school in 1899.

Settlers began arriving in the area around Mount Mee in 1873, many being timber-getters attracted by the red cedar timber that was readily available in the area.  Initially, timber cut down in the area was exported to the nearby towns of Caboolture, D'Aguilar and Woodford, but a sawmill was eventually built in the fledgling town. A number of larger mills were operated on various parts of the mountain until the last closed in 1982.

Dahmongah Provisional School opened on 20 February 1884. In 1900, it was renamed Mount Mee Provisional School. It closed in 1904 due to low student numbers but opened again in 1909. On 1 October 1909, it became Mount Mee State School.

Mount Mee Methodist Church was consecrated on 16 December 1922. As at 2020, it is a community church which can be used for any Christian purpose.

Mount Mee Public Hall opened in 1933.

A special tractor called the Linn tractor was used to haul logs instead of bullock teams in the early 1930s. Over time, agriculture became important to the economy of the area, with dairy farms and banana plantations being particularly important.

Mount Mee Banana Settlement State School opened on 4 April 1934 and closed circa 1939.

Mount Mee was initially governed as a part of the Caboolture Divisional Board, later the Shire of Caboolture. In 2008, the shire was amalgamated with Pine Rivers Shire and Redcliffe City to form the Moreton Bay Region.

The median age of the Mount Mee population was 49 years, 11 years above the national median of 38. 73.6% of people living in Mount Mee were born in Australia. The other top responses for country of birth were England 5.7%, Scotland 1.5%, New Zealand 1.3%, Germany and Netherlands 0.8%. 84.9% of people spoke only English at home; the next most common languages were 0.6% Spanish and Slovene.

State Forest and Forest Reserve
Mount Mee State Forest and Forest Reserve is a nature preserve located in Mount Mee.  It features eucalyptus forests, small sections of rainforest, and plantations of Hoop Pine.  They adjoin the Brisbane Forest Park.  The park features six different walking tracks, two picnic grounds, a camping ground, and numerous tracks for offroad driving.

Education 
Mount Mee State School is a government primary (Prep-6) school for boys and girls at 1368 Mt Mee Road. In 2017, the school had an enrolment of 72 students with 9 teachers (5 full-time equivalent) and 5 non-teaching staff (3 full-time equivalent).  In 2018, the school had an enrolment of 70 students with 9 teachers (4 full-time equivalent) and 5 non-teaching staff (3 full-time equivalent). In 2021, this number declined to 53 students and 8 teachers (3.9 full-time equivalent) and 7 non-teaching staff (3.6 full-time equivalent).

There are no secondary schools in Mount Mee. The nearest government secondary school is Woodford State School (to Year 10) in Woodford to the north. For secondary education to Year 12, the options are Tullawong State High School in Caboolture to the east, Kilcoy State High School in Kilcoy to the north-west, and Bray Park State High School in Bray Park to the south-east.

Amenities 

The Moreton Bay Regional Council operates a mobile library service which visits near the Mount Mee Public Hall at 1352 Mount Mee Road. The council also operates the hall with the assistance of local volunteers.

The Mount Mee Community Church is shared by a number of denominations (Anglican, Catholic, Lutheran and Uniting Churches). A weekly service is held at the church by one denomination on a roster system. It is at 1345 Mount Mee Road across the road from the Community Hall. It has views from the mountain.

Mount Mee Cemetery is at 1 Cemetery Road, off Settlement Road.

Attractions 
The Pitstop Cafe has excellent views, a large range of automotive and racing memorabilia and food.

Lookouts at Mount Mee in D'Aguilar National Park include:

 Falls Lookout
 Bulls Lookout
both of which are accessed from the Falls Lookout Track which commences from Neurem Road.

References

External links

 

Suburbs of Moreton Bay Region
Populated places established in 1873
Mee, Mount
1873 establishments in Australia
Localities in Queensland
Towns in Queensland